Proper names for planets outside of the Solar System – known as exoplanets – are chosen by the International Astronomical Union (IAU) through public naming contests known as NameExoWorlds.

Naming 
The IAU's names for exoplanets – and on most occasions their host stars – are chosen by the Executive Committee Working Group (ECWG) on Public Naming of Planets and Planetary Satellites, a group working parallel with the Working Group on Star Names (WGSN). Proper names of stars chosen by the ECWG are explicitly recognised by the WGSN. The ECWG's rules for naming exoplanets are identical to those adopted by the Minor Planet Center for minor planets. Names are a single word consisting of sixteen characters or less, pronounceable in some language, non-offensive, and not identical to existing proper names of astronomical objects. Copyrighted names, names of living individuals, and names with political or religious themes are blacklisted by the ECWG. In addition, the discoverer of a planet reserves the right to reject a proposed name for it.

List

See also 

 List of exoplanets
 List of proper names of stars

References 
Sources

 

Citations

External links 
 Official website of NameExoWorlds

 
 Proper names of exoplanets, list of